Mistinguett (born Jeanne Florentine Bourgeois; 5 April 1873 – 5 January 1956) was a French actress and singer. She was at one time the highest-paid female entertainer in the world.

Early life

The daughter of Antoine Bourgeois, a 31-year-old day-labourer, and Jeannette Debrée, a 21-year-old seamstress, Jeanne Bourgeois was born at 5 Rue du Chemin-de-Fer (today Rue Gaston-Israël), in Enghien-les-Bains, Val-d'Oise, Île-de-France, France. The family moved to Soisy-sous-Montmorency where she spent her childhood; her parents later worked as mattress-makers.

At an early age Bourgeois aspired to be an entertainer. She began as a flower seller in a restaurant in her hometown, singing popular ballads as she sold blossoms.

Entertainer 

After taking classes in theatre and singing, she began her career as an entertainer in 1885. One day on the train to Paris for a violin lesson, she met Saint-Marcel, who directed the revue at the Casino de Paris. He engaged her first as a stage-hand, and here she began to pursue her goal to become an entertainer, experimenting with various stage-names, being successively Miss Helyett, Miss Tinguette, Mistinguette and, finally, Mistinguett. In the 1880s Mistinguett visited her neighbour Anna Thibaud to ask for advice. Thibaud told her, "To succeed in the theatre ... you must be pretty. You must excite men." Mistinguett asked if she meant that she had to excite the crowds. Thibaud repeated, "No, the men!"

Bourgeois made her debut as Mistinguett at the Casino de Paris in 1895 and went on to appear in venues such as the Folies Bergère, Moulin Rouge and Eldorado. Her risqué routines captivated Paris, and she went on to become the most popular French entertainer of her time and the highest-paid female entertainer in the world, known for her flamboyance and a zest for the theatrical. In 1919, her legs were insured for 500,000 Francs.

Though Mistinguett never married, she had a son, Leopoldo João de Lima e Silva, born in 1901, from a liaison she had with a Brazilian diplomat, Leopoldo José de Lima e Silva (1872-1931). She also had a long relationship with Maurice Chevalier, 13 years her junior. It is claimed that she and Chevalier informed the police in 1940 that singer-songwriter Charles Trenet was gay and consorting with youths.

She first recorded her signature song, "Mon Homme", in 1916. It was popularised under its English title "My Man" by Fanny Brice and has become a standard in the repertoire of numerous pop and jazz singers.

During a tour of the United States, Mistinguett was asked by Time magazine to explain her popularity. Her answer was, "It is a kind of magnetism. I say 'Come closer' and draw them to me."

Death

Mistinguett died in Bougival, France, at the age of 82, attended by her son, a doctor. She is buried in the Cimetière Enghien-les-Bains, Île-de-France, France.

Upon her death, writer Jean Cocteau observed in an obituary, "Her voice, slightly off-key, was that of the Parisian street hawkers—the husky, trailing voice of the Paris people. She was of the animal race that owes nothing to intellectualism. She incarnated herself. She flattered a French patriotism that was not shameful. It is normal now that she should crumble, like the other caryatids of that great and marvelous epoch that was ours".

Gallery

Filmography

 Carosello del varietà (1955)
 Paris 1900 (1947)
 Rigolboche (1936) .... Lina Bourget
 Island of Love (1929)
 Mistinguett détective II (1917)
 Mistinguett détective (1917)
 Flower of Paris (1916) .... Margot Panard et Mistinguett
 Sous la menace (1916)
 The Gold Chignon (1916)
 Doppia ferita, La (1915)
 Valse renversante, La (1914)
 Misérables – Époque 4: Cosette et Marius, Les (1913) .... Éponine
 Misérables – Époque 3: Cosette, Les (1913) .... Éponine
 Misérables – Époque 2: Fantine, Les (1913) .... Éponine Thénardier
 Misérables – Époque 1: Jean Valjean, Les (1913) .... Éponine Thénardier
 Glu, La (1913) .... Fernande, dite 'La Glu'
 Une bougie récalcitrante (1912)
 Parapluie, Le (1912)
 Vocation de Lolo, La (1912)
 À bas les hommes (1912)
 Bal costumé (1912)
 Coup de foudre, Le (1912)
 Folle de Penmarch, La (1912) .... Yvonne ... aka Folle de Pen-March, La (France)
 Moche, La (1912)
 L'Oubliée, L (1912)
 Un enfant terrible (1912)
 Clown et le pacha, Le (1911)
 Épouvante, L' (1911) .... La star de music-hall ... aka Terror-Stricken (UK)
 Ruse de Miss Plumcake, La (1911) .... Miss Plumcake
 Timidités de Rigadin, Les (1910) .... La fiancée de Rigadin
 Ce bon docteur (1909)
 L'Enlèvement de Mademoiselle Biffin (1909)
 Un mari qui l'échappe belle (1909)
 Fiancée récalcitrante, La (1909)
 Fleur de pavé (1909)
 L'Empreinte ou La main rouge (1908)

ReferencesParis Journal was written by Janet Flanner, Paris writer for the New Yorker'', 1925–1975.

External links

Mistinguett by Lenci, c.1924
Photographs and literature

1873 births
1956 deaths
People from Enghien-les-Bains
French stage actresses
French women singers
Cabaret singers
French silent film actresses
French film actresses
French vedettes
19th-century French actresses
20th-century French actresses
Moulin Rouge